Sergey Petrovich Dikaryov (born June 29, 1963 in Ruzayevka, Mordvin ASSR, Russian SFSR, Soviet Union) is a professional association football coach and a former player from Russia.

External links
Career summary at KLISF

1963 births
Living people
Soviet footballers
Russian footballers
FC SKA Rostov-on-Don players
FC Rotor Volgograd players
Russian expatriate footballers
Expatriate footballers in Moldova
Russian football managers
Russian expatriate sportspeople in Moldova
FC Mordovia Saransk players
Association football defenders
PFC Krylia Sovetov Samara players